The Jerusalem News was the first English-language newspaper in Jerusalem, existing for around six months during the British Mandate for Palestine.

The Jerusalem News was established in 1919 under the auspices of the Christian Science movement. William Denison McCrackan, the associated editor of both the Christian Science Journal and Christian Science Sentinel, was critical of the Zionist slogan "a land without a people for a people without a land". He said, "We used to read in our papers the slogan of Zionism, 'to give back a people to a Land without a People,' while the truth was that Palestine was already well-peopled with a population which was rapidly increasing from natural causes." Following the conquest of Palestine by the British Army in 1917, Christian Science interested itself in the affairs of Palestine, first organizing relief work and then with starting a new newspaper. The Jerusalem News paper was originally established in 1919 by Elizabeth Lippincott McQueen, a British-American woman who would later become a women's aeronautics pioneer, and who had in the aftermath of WWI served in war relief work in Palestine under Field Marshal Allenby. The first issue, on Dec. 9, 1919, bore a congratulatory message from Allenby, then High Commissioner for Egypt.

In February 1920 the British-American writer and journalist Talbot Mundy - McCrackan's co-worker and personal friend -  arrived in Jerusalem. There he became the Jerusalem News''' editorial assistant, being involved in writing articles, reporting on current events, proof reading, and editing. Talbot witnessed the increasing conflict between Arab and Jewish populations within the city, and was present during the Nebi Musa riots.  McCrackan was the editor. The copies of the Jerusalem News preserved at the Library of Congress begin on Dec. 9, 1919 and cease with no. 151 (June 8, 1920). The end of the paper's publication was explained by its having been "a wartime publication" and that the start of a British civil administration necessitated a different kind of paper. There was no continuity between this short-lived paper and what would later become The Jerusalem Post'', the primary and long-lasting English-language newspaper based in the city.

References

1919 establishments in British-administered Palestine
1920 disestablishments in Mandatory Palestine
Publications established in 1919
Publications disestablished in 1920
English-language newspapers published in Asia
Culture of Jerusalem
Jewish businesses established in Mandatory Palestine
Mass media in Jerusalem
Newspapers published in Mandatory Palestine